The Twenty Questions Murder Mystery is a 1950 British crime film directed by Paul L. Stein and starring Robert Beatty, Rona Anderson, and Clifford Evans.

Plot
The screenplay concerns a man who sends in a question to the BBC panel show Twenty Questions before he commits a murder. A number of people play themselves as members of the Twenty Questions panel.

Cast

References

External links

1950 films
1950 crime films
Films directed by Paul L. Stein
Films shot at Southall Studios
British crime films
British black-and-white films
Films with screenplays by Patrick Kirwan
Films about murder
1950s English-language films
1950s British films